Kheyl Gavan (also Romanized as Kheyl Gāvān) is a village in Khoshabar Rural District, in the Central District of Rezvanshahr County, Gilan Province, Iran. At the 2006 census, its population was 27, in 8 families.

References 

Populated places in Rezvanshahr County